"Walang Natira" is the first single of the Filipino rapper, Gloc-9 off his 5th studio album, Talumpati. The song has been written by Gloc-9 and released under Sony Music Philippines. The song also features former Pinoy Dream Academy scholar, Sheng Belmonte. It is an advocacy song dedicated to all Overseas Filipino workers (OFWs), why they have opted to work thousands of miles away from their loved ones, and what they are going through abroad just to provide a good life for their family. Gloc-9 shared that the song is inspired by his own experience having an OFW Father who worked in Saudi Arabia.

Message and structure
The song tells the situation in the Philippines on why some Filipinos are working abroad. The song also relates the experiences of OFWs while working abroad, like being restless (pahinga’y iipunin para magamit pag-uwi), or sometimes being abused, or dying without even a witness (...gugutumin, sasaktan, malalagay sa peligro. Uuwing nasa kahon ni wala man lang testigo).

Viewpoints of Oscar Cruz
On January 21, 2011, Archbishop Emeritus Oscar V. Cruz posted a blog on his blogspot stating his views on the Walang Natira. According to him, the song generally has likable tunes, and was pleasing to listen to — but at the same time it proclaimed the heartaches and griefs of Filipinos working abroad.

He divided his viewpoints into four categories: the message of the song, complaints of the song, some heartaches of the song, and certain reservations of the song.

Message of the song
 The Philippines has good manpower
 The good manpower appears to be going - is gone
 The good manpower are going abroad

Complaints of the song
 Absence of local employment
 No choice but to work abroad
 Filipinos are thus everywhere except in their own country, unable to stay with their families

Some heartaches of the song
 The Philippines is like a tree whose fruits have been picked out ('Lupa kong sinilangan ang pangalan ay Pinas, ngunit bakit parang puno na ang prutas ay pitas)
 It has no necessary laws just as it has no rice (Nauubusan ng batas parang inamag na bigas)
 The rains are becoming strong but its umbrella is full of holes (Lumalakas na ang ulan ngunit ang payong ay butas)
 The leaders are benefiting much but the citizens are being done away with (Mga pinuno ay ungas sila lamang ang nakikinabang pero tayo ang utas)

Certain reservations of the song
 The children no longer know their fathers. (Ng anak na halos di na kilala ang ama)
 The mothers are usually away during the birthdays of their children. (O ina na wala sa tuwing kaarawan nila)
 If better days are not forthcoming, then you better think ahead. (Darating kaya ang araw na ito'y mag-iiba, Kung hindi ka sigurado mag-isip isip ka na.)
 Little properties are mortgaged to leave the country to go anywhere and for whatever purpose. (Isasanla ang lahat ng kanilang mga pag-aari, Mababawi din naman yan ang sabi pagnayari, Ang proseso ng papeles para makasakay na sa eroplano, O barko kahit saan man papunta)
 Never mind the sweat and toil, the hunger and violence, even if he or she comes back in a coffin. (Gugutumin sasaktan malalagay sa piligro, Uuwing nasa kahon ni wala man lang testigo)

Professions and jobs named in the song
 Guro (Teachers)
 Nars (Nurses)
 Inhinyero (Engineers)
 Karpintero (Carpenter) mortel
 Kasambahay (Housekeepers/Maids)
 Labandera (Launderers)

References

External links
 Sony Music Philippines

2010 singles
Gloc-9 songs
2010 songs
Songs written by Gloc-9
Tagalog-language songs